"I Got It Bad (and That Ain't Good)" is a pop and jazz standard with music by Duke Ellington and lyrics by Paul Francis Webster published in 1941. It was introduced in the musical revue Jump for Joy by Ivie Anderson, who also provided the vocals for Duke Ellington and His Orchestra on the single Victor 27531. Recordings to reach the Billboard charts in 1941/42 were by Duke Ellington (#13) and by Benny Goodman (vocal by Peggy Lee) (#25).

Recorded versions by notable artists

Al Aarons
John "Johnny" Adriano Acea
Cannonball Adderley
Jamey Aebersold
Harry Allen
Carl Anderson
Ernestine Anderson
Ivie Anderson
Susie Arioli
Louis Armstrong
Benny Bailey
Guy Barker
Bruce Barth
Count Basie
BBC Big Band
Tobias Beecher
Madeline Bell
Joe Benjamin
Tony Bennett
Big Miller
Paul Bley
Carolyn Breuer
Marvin Gaye
Charles Brown
Sandy Brown
Beryl Bryden
Kenny Burrell
Charlie Byrd
Donald Byrd
Ann Hampton Callaway
Harry Carney
Benny Carter
Cher - Bittersweet White Light (1973)
June Christy 
Rosemary Clooney
Nat King Cole
John Coltrane
Doris Day with Les Brown and his orchestra
Yvonne De Carlo
Buddy DeFranco
Bill Evans
Eileen Farrell
Ella Fitzgerald
Sara Gazarek - Live at the Jazz Bakery (2006)
Red Garland
Benny Goodman
Earl Grant
Roy Hamilton
Earl Hines - An Evening with Earl Hines (Chiaroscuro, 1977)
Johnny Hodges
Billie Holiday
Shirley Horn
Lena Horne
Phyllis Hyman
Joe Jackson
Ahmad Jamal
Etta James
Keith Jarrett
Molly Johnson
Stacey Kent - The Boy Next Door (2003)
Stan Kenton - Rendezvous of Standards and Classics (1995)
Gladys Knight - Before Me (2006)
Dayna Kurtz
Peggy Lee
Chuck Loeb
Julie London - The Ultimate Collection (2005)
Margaret
Millicent Martin
Jane Monheit
Thelonious Monk
Vaughn Monroe
The Oscar Peterson Trio
Lou Rawls
Della Reese
Dianne Reeves - "Dianne Reeves" (1987)
Carly Simon
Nina Simone
Frank Sinatra - A Swingin' Affair! (1957)
Jo Stafford
Donna Summer
Toni Tennille (1984)
McCoy Tyner
US Navy Band Commodores Jazz Ensemble
Dinah Washington
Weather Report
Ben Webster

Notes

Songs with music by Duke Ellington
Songs with lyrics by Paul Francis Webster
Jazz compositions in G major